Mohammad Qasim or Mohammed Qassem may refer to:

People

Sports 
 Muhammad Qasim (footballer) (born 1984), Pakistani footballer
 Mohammed Qasem (born 1987), Palestinian footballer
 Mohammed Qasim (born 1991), Emirati cricketer
 Muhammad Qasim (field hockey) (1974–2006), Pakistani field hockey player
 Mohammed Qassem (footballer, born 1990), Saudi Arabian footballer
 Mohammed Qassem (footballer, born 1995), Saudi Arabian footballer
 Mohammed Qasim Majid (born 1996), Iraqi footballer

Government and politics 
 Mohammad Qasim (Mardan politician), member of the National Assembly of Pakistan from 2008 to 2013
 Muhammad Qasim (senator), Member of the Senate of Pakistan from 2021
 Mohammad Qasim Fahim (1957–2014), also known as "Marshal Fahim", vice president of Afghanistan
 Mohammad Qasim Hashimzai, Deputy Minister of Justice of the Islamic Republic of Afghanistan
 Mohammad Qasim Osmani (born 1969), Iranian politician
 Mohammad Qasim Osmani (born 1969), Iranian politician
 Mohammad Qasim Rasikh, (born 1971), Afghan Deputy Chief Justice

Other 
 Muhammad Qasim Nanautavi (1832 – 15 April 1880), Islamic Scholar from India.

Places
 Mohammad Qasem, a village in Sistan and Baluchestan Province, Iran
 Mohammad Qasemi, a village in Fars Province, Iran

See also
 Mohammed Kazem (born 1969), Emirati contemporary artist
 Mohammed Kazem Yazdi (1831–1919), Iranian Islamic scholar
 Mohammed Kasim Reed (born 1969), American politician